Ooty is a 1999 Indian Tamil-language film directed by Anwar. The film stars Murali and Roja, while Ajay Kapoor, Rajesh and Chinni Jayanth play other supporting roles. The film, which has music by Deva, released in November 1999.

Cast
Murali as Balakumar
Roja as Charulatha
Ajay Kapoor as Vasanthakumar (Kumar)
Rajesh as Balu's Uncle
Ramji as Mohan
Chinni Jayanth as Vivek
Vaiyapuri as Vaiyapuri

Production
The film was briefly delayed after actor Arvind Swami filed a case against the producers, Nikaba Films, who failed to pay him for En Swasa Kaatre (1999).

Soundtrack
The soundtrack was composed by Deva and lyrics written by Pulamaipithan, Pazhani Bharathi and Na. Muthukumar.

Release
The film received positive reviews upon release, with a critic from Indolink.com noting it was "worth a watch". Another reviewer mentioned "Some movies surprise us. They involve us quite successfully throughout the duration of the movie though we wonder how when we think about them later. Ooty is one such movie. The credit for its effectiveness largely goes to director Anwar who has fashioned an interesting movie out of a story and situations which we have seen before."

References

Films shot in Ooty
1999 films
1990s Tamil-language films
Indian drama films
Films scored by Deva (composer)